Hough is a civil parish in Cheshire East, England. It contains three buildings that are recorded in the National Heritage List for England as designated listed buildings. Of these, two are listed at Grade II*, the middle grade, and the other is at Grade II. The parish includes the village of Hough and is otherwise rural. The listed buildings consist of two houses and a gateway.

Key

Buildings

See also

 Listed buildings in Blakenhall
 Listed buildings in Chorlton
 Listed buildings in Lea
 Listed buildings in Shavington cum Gresty
 Listed buildings in Wybunbury

References
Citations

Sources

 

Listed buildings in the Borough of Cheshire East
Lists of listed buildings in Cheshire